The Federal TRIO Programs (TRIO, also stylized as TRiO) are federal outreach and student services programs in the United States designed to identify and provide services for individuals from disadvantaged backgrounds. They are administered, funded, and implemented by the United States Department of Education. TRIO includes eight programs targeted to serve and assist low-income individuals, first-generation college students, and individuals with disabilities to progress through the academic pipeline from middle school to post-baccalaureate programs. TRIO also includes a training program for directors and staff of TRIO projects. Their existence is owed to the passing of the Higher Education Act of 1965.
TRIO was given its name after the first three programs (Upward Bound, Talent Search, Student Support Services) were implemented; the name is not an acronym.

Programs
The eight programs administered are (in order of creation):
Upward Bound
Upward Bound (UB) is a federally funded educational program within the United States. The program is one of a cluster of programs referred to as TRIO, all of which owe their existence to the federal Higher Education Act of 1965. Upward Bound programs are implemented and monitored by the United States Department of Education. The goal of Upward Bound is to provide certain categories of high school students better opportunities for attending college. The categories of greatest concern are those with low income, those with parents who did not attend college, and those living in rural areas. The program works through individual grants, each of which covers a restricted geographic area and provide services to approximately 50 to 100 students annually. Upward Bound alumni include Democratic Political Strategist Donna Brazile, Academy Award Winner Viola Davis, ABC News Correspondent John Quiñones and former NBA player Patrick Ewing.

Talent Search
Talent Search (TS) identifies junior high and high school students who might benefit from intervention strategies meant to increase the chances of the student pursuing a college education. There are currently more than 475 TS programs in the U.S. serving more than 389,000 students. At least two-thirds of the students in each local TS program must be from low-income economic backgrounds and from families where parents do not have a bachelor's degree. TS is a grant-funded program. Local programs are required to demonstrate that they meet federal requirements every five years in order to maintain funding. Talent Search alumni include US Congressman Henry Bonilla.

Student Support Services
Student Support Services (SSS) receives funding through a federal grant competition. Funds are awarded to institutions of higher education to provide opportunities for academic development, assist students with basic college requirements, and to motivate students toward the successful completion of their postsecondary education. SSS projects also may provide grant aid to current participants who are receiving Federal Pell Grants. The goal of SSS is to increase the college retention and graduation rates of its participants. Alumni of Student Support Services include Viola Davis and Franklin Chang-Diaz.

Educational Opportunity Centers
The Educational Opportunity Centers program (EOC) provides counseling and information on college admissions to qualified adults who want to enter or continue a program of postsecondary education. The program also provides services to improve the financial and economic literacy of participants. An important objective of the program is to counsel participants on financial aid options, including basic financial planning skills, and to assist in the application process. The goal of the EOC program is to increase the number of adult participants who enroll in postsecondary education institutions.

Veterans Upward Bound
Veterans Upward Bound (VUB) is designed to motivate and assist veterans in the development of academic and other requisite skills necessary for acceptance and success in a program of postsecondary education. The program provides assessment and enhancement of basic skills through counseling, mentoring, tutoring, and academic instruction in the core subject areas. The primary goal of the program is to increase the rate at which participants enroll in and complete postsecondary education programs.

Training Program for Federal TRIO Programs
The purpose of the Training Program for Federal TRIO Programs (TRIO Staff Training) is to increase the effectiveness of TRIO programs through staff training and development. Through a grant competition, funds are awarded to institutions of higher education and other public and private nonprofit institutions and organizations to support training to enhance the skills and expertise of project directors and staff employed in the Federal TRIO Programs. Funds may be used for conferences, seminars, internships, workshops, or the publication of manuals. Training topics are based on priorities established by the Secretary of Education and announced in Federal Register notices inviting applications.

Ronald E. McNair Post-Baccalaureate Achievement Program
The Ronald E. McNair Post-Baccalaureate Achievement Program, often referred to as the McNair Scholars Program, is a United States Department of Education initiative with a goal of increasing "attainment of PhD degrees by students from underrepresented segments of society," including first-generation low-income individuals and members from racial and ethnic groups historically underrepresented in graduate programs.

Upward Bound Math-Science
Upward Bound Math-Science (UBMS) was first authorized through the Higher Education Act of 1965 and reauthorized in the Higher Education Opportunity Act of 2008. Participating students must have completed the eighth grade and be low-income or "potential first-generation college students", with two-thirds of selected applicants meeting both of the criteria. The program provides counseling, summer programs, research, computer training, and connections to university faculty with the goal of improving students' math and science skills and helping them obtain degrees and careers in the maths and sciences. Students in the summer program attend 5 weeks of English, math, and science classes in the summer months. Mathematics classes include algebra, geometry, precalculus, calculus, and science courses are held for biology, chemistry, and physics. After completing the program, the student receives one college credit from the associated institution.

Notable TRIO participants

 Hector Balderas, Upward Bound, New Mexico State Auditor
 Angela Bassett, Upward Bound, Academy Award-nominated actress
 Henry Bonilla, Talent Search, US Congressman
 Donna Brazile, Upward Bound, political strategist, TV commentator, interim chairperson of the Democratic National Committee
 Franklin Chang-Diaz, Student Support Services, first Hispanic astronaut
 Kenneth Corn, Talent Search, youngest Oklahoma State Representative (22), youngest Oklahoma State Senator (25)
 Viola Davis, Upward Bound, Student Support Services, Academy Award-winning actress
 Patrick Ewing, Upward Bound, coach, Olympian and former professional basketball player
 A. C. Green, Student Support Services, former professional basketball player
 Bernard Harris, Ronald E. McNair Scholar, first African-American astronaut to perform an extra-vehicular activity (spacewalk)
 Wil Haygood, Upward Bound, author and journalist
 José M. Hernández, Upward Bound, second Hispanic astronaut
 Jimmy Jam and Terry Lewis, Upward Bound, music producers
 Kenny Leon, Upward Bound, director, Tony Award-nominated actor
 Gwendolynne Moore, Student Support Services, US Congresswoman
 Anastasia Pittman, Student Support Services, Oklahoma State Representative
 Troy Polamalu, Upward Bound, professional football player
 John Quiñones, Upward Bound, correspondent for ABC News, Prime Time Live
 Kevin Shibilski, Student Support Services, Wisconsin State Senator

References

External links 
 Upward Bound Math-Science
 Talent Search Program

United States federal education legislation